Freudenstadt is a Landkreis (district) in the middle of Baden-Württemberg, Germany. Neighboring districts are (from north clockwise) Rastatt, Calw, Tübingen, Zollernalbkreis, Rottweil and the Ortenaukreis.

History
The district was created in 1938 as the successor of the Oberamt Freudenstadt which dated back to 1806. In 1973 it was merged with the majority of the neighboring district of Horb, and some small parts of the districts of Wolfach and Hechingen.

Geography
The district is located in the middle part of the Black Forest mountains. The river Neckar flows through the southeast of the district.

Coat of arms

Towns and municipalities

References

External links

Official website (German, English, French)

 
Karlsruhe (region)
Districts of Baden-Württemberg